David Joel Barrera (born December 28, 1968) is an American actor. He is best known for his role as Gunnery Sgt. Ray 'Casey Kasem' Griego in Generation Kill. He has appeared in television series including Grimm, Heroes, CSI: Miami, Boston Legal, Medium, Nip/Tuck, NYPD Blue, Murder One, Without a Trace, The West Wing, The Big Bang Theory and 24 for which he got nominated for an ALMA Award.

Barrera is a graduate of Pharr-San Juan-Alamo High School in his hometown, San Juan, Texas, where he was part of the Theater Club. This high school is part of the Pharr-San Juan-Alamo Independent School District. David Barrera is a graduate of Southern Methodist University, and went on to study in the graduate acting program at the University of California, San Diego. He is currently an Adjunct Faculty member teaching acting at Azusa Pacific University.

Barrera appeared in Universal's family comedy Evan Almighty, further he worked on films like Infinity, No Way Back and The United States of Leland (First Officer).

Barrera guest starred in the episode, "Alex Gives Up", as Carlos Cucuy in a Disney Channel Original Series live-action sitcom, Wizards of Waverly Place in which his wife, Maria, was one of the main cast members. In 2015, Barrera guest starred in the episode, "Flicker", as Dr. Kaplan in the fifth season of American Horror Story.

Personal life
Barrera has been married to actress Maria Canals-Barrera since 1999, and they have two daughters.

Filmography

Film

Television

Video Games

Awards
While at the University of California, San Diego graduate acting program he was awarded the Princess Grace Award in acting.

References

External links
 
 

American male television actors
Living people
University of California, San Diego alumni
People from Hidalgo County, Texas
Male actors from Texas
1968 births
Princess Grace Awards winners
Southern Methodist University alumni
American people of Bolivian descent